Motte, la Motte, de la Motte, and LaMotte are French surnames. The Portuguese and Spanish version is Mota, and the Italian version is Motta. Notable people with the surname include:

Antoine Houdar de la Motte (1672–1731), French author
August de la Motte (1713–1788), Hanoverian general 
Benjamin Motte (1693–1738), English publisher 
Benjamin Motte Sr. (died 1710), English publisher
Bernard Lamotte (1903–1983), French artist
Camille du Bois de la Motte (fl. 1789), French marchioness
Capucine Motte (born 1971), Belgian writer
Clarence Petersen de la Motte (born 1892), Australian sailor
Diether de la Motte (1928–2010), German musician, composer, music theorist, and academic teacher
Edme Joachim Bourdois de La Motte (1754–1835), French doctor
Ellen N. La Motte (1873–1961), American nurse, journalist and author
Étienne Lamotte (1903–1983), Belgian priest and indologist
François Henri de la Motte (died 1781), French army officer 
Friedrich de la Motte Fouqué (1777–1843), German writer
Heinrich August de la Motte Fouqué (1698–1774), French-Prussian lieutenant general
Henri-Paul Motte (1846–1922), French painter
Isaac Motte (1738–1795), American statesman
Jason Motte (born 1982), American baseball player
Jeanne-Marie Bouvier de la Motte-Guyon (1648–1717), French mystic
Lisa de la Motte (born 1985), Swazi swimmer
Marguerite De La Motte (1902–1950), American actress
Nathaniel Motte (born 1984), American recording artist
Nicholas de la Motte (1755–1831), French nobleman
Pierre Lambert de la Motte (1624–1679), French bishop
Toussaint-Guillaume Picquet de la Motte (1720–1791), French admiral
Tyler Motte (born 1995), American ice hockey player

See also
Alfred Motté (1887–1918), French Olympian
Mado Lamotte, stage name of Canadian drag queen Luc Provost
Motte (disambiguation)
Lamotte (disambiguation)

French-language surnames